Anh Tuấn (full name: Nguyễn Anh Tuấn) is a Vietnamese voice actor who was born on October 23, 1984 in Vietnam. Before, he has work at TVM Corp (HTV3). He had dubbed for other characters in cartoons, anime, television series, movie... and the popular role was Nobita in Doraemon anime and movie.

Work

TV series 
 My Girlfriend Is a Nine-Tailed Fox (Cha Dae-woong)
 City Hunter (TV series) (Lee Yoon Sung)
 Brilliant Legacy (Sun Woo Hwan)
 The Innocent Man (TV series) (Kang Ma-roo)
 The Heirs (Kim Tan)
 Boys Over Flowers (TV series) (Jun Pyo) 
 Secret Campus (Do Hyun)
 The 1st Shop of Coffee Prince (Han Kyul)
 You're Beautiful (TV series) (Hwang Tae Kyung)
 1 Litre no Namida (TV series) (Hiroshi Mizuno)
 The Prince Who Turns into a Frog (Shan Jun Hao) 
 Big (TV series) (Seo Yoon Jae/Kang Kyung Joon)
 Phantom (TV series) (Jo Hyun Min)
 Oshin (Yuu Tanokura)
 Iljimae (Iljimae/Gyeom)

Movie 
 Ice Age (Manny)
 Horton Hears a Who! (Horton)
 Happy Feet (Mumble)
 Open Season (Elliot)
Stand by Me Doraemon (Nobita)
 Rio (Blu)
 Harry Potter (Harry)

Cartoons and anime 
 Captain Tsubasa (Tsubasa)
 Tsubasa: Reservoir Chronicle (Syaoran)
 Doraemon (Nobita)
 Tiểu Bao Thanh Thiên (Bao Chửng)
 Xiaolin Showdown (Omi)
 Fruit Basket (Yuki Sohma)
 Samurai 7 (Katsushiro)
 Daigunder (Akira)
 Cyborg Kuro-chan (Mikun)
 Howie & Landau (Howie)
 Cardcaptor Sakura (Yukito)
 Boys Over Flowers (Tsukasa) 
 Neighborhood Story (Tsutomu)
 Pokémon (Cilan, Clemont, Meowth, Professor Oak, Kiawe)
 Naruto (Neji) 
 The Smurfs (Tí Mộng Mơ)
 The Snow Queen (anime) (Kay)
 Bubu Chacha (Nicky)
 Tayo the Little Bus (Gani)
 Thomas & Friends (Edward)

References 

1984 births
Vietnamese male voice actors
Living people
Vietnamese voice directors
21st-century Vietnamese male actors